Jim Courier and Pete Sampras were the defending champions, but Sampras did not participate this year.  Courier partnered Martin Davis, losing in the final

Sergio Casal and Emilio Sánchez won the title, defeating Courier and Davis 7–6, 7–5 in the final.

Seeds

Draw

Finals

Top half

Bottom half

External links
1990 Peugeot Italian Open Doubles Draw

1990 Italian Open (tennis)